The Cool World is a novel published 1959 written by American author Warren Miller. Subsequent adaptations for a play and film of the same title were subsequently released in 1960 and 1964 respectively.

1959 American novels
American novels adapted into films